Leuresthes sardina, commonly known as Gulf grunion, is a species of grunion endemic to the Gulf of California. It is classified as Near Threatened by the IUCN.

References 

Atherinopsidae
Fish described in 1889